Payyans is a 2011 Indian Malayalam family-drama film written and directed by Leo Thaddeus. 
It stars Jayasurya, Anjali, Rohini, Lal and Lalu Alex. The film's score was composed by Rahul Raj whilst the songs were by Alphons Joseph. It narrates the story of a reckless youth who is forced to act his age and take responsibility for his actions.

Plot
The film explores the relationship between a mother and a child. The central character Josy is brought up all by his mother Padma after her father John's "disappearance". Apparently, Josy's problems start with the disappearance of his father. He drops out from the college to start his own business. But he does not succeed in his venture because of the lifestyle he leads. Later he gets a job as a Radio Jockey where he meets sound engineer Seema and falls in love.

One day John gives a call to Padma to let her know that he is alive. In excitement Padma tries to pull John's bag and she slips, falls down and dies due to fatal head injuries. Problems start when John attempts to bring Josy's life into a proper way by enforcing discipline.
. But his plans does not work out the way he planned it to be. Josy starts to hate John and on one night when he was drunk, he asks his dad to walk out.

Josy later understands how much his dad loved him. He searches for him unsuccessfully. On fathers' day when Josy was anchoring a show about it, John calls to the show and tells his experience of a dad as how much he loved his kid when he was young and how much the kid dislikes him when he grew older. Josy saw that the call came from his own home and rushes home where he finds dad and reunites with him.

Cast
 Jayasurya as Josy John
 Anjali as Seema
 Lal as John Varghese
 Rohini as Padma
 Lalu Alex as Kuttappan 
 Suraj Venjaramoodu as Brittas
 Janardhanan as Brittas's father
 Guinness Pakru as Japan Babu
 Kalasala Babu
 Harisree Martin
 Manka Mahesh
 Sayuj S. Menon as Josy's boss, Red FM 93.5 manager

Production
The film marked the debut of Anjali in Malayalam cinema.

Soundtrack

The songs of the film were composed by Alphons Joseph with lyrics penned by Kaithapram Damodaran, Anil Panachooran. The background score for the film was composed by Rahul Raj.

References

External links 
 
 
 
 

2010s Malayalam-language films
Indian slapstick comedy films
2011 comedy films
2011 films
Films scored by Alphons Joseph